Pseudometapterus is a little-known genus of thread-legged bug in the subfamily Emesinae. Members of the genus occur in North America and usually have wings that are extremely small or absent entirely, though a winged form of P. umbrosus is known from Southern Illinois.

Partial species list
Pseudometapterus argentinus Berg, 1900)
Pseudometapterus butleri Wygodzinsky, 1966
Pseudometapterus umbrosus (Blatchley, 1926) 	 
Pseudometapterus wygodzinskyi (Elkins, 1953)

References

Reduviidae
Cimicomorpha genera
Insects of North America